Yi Wang is the Faculty Distinguished Professor of Radiology and professor of biomedical engineering at Cornell University. He is a Fellow of the American Institute for Medical and Biological Engineering (2007), the IEEE (for which he also received citation "for contributions to cardiovascular MRI development and quantitative susceptibility mapping"), and a Senior Fellow of the International Society for Magnetic Resonance in Medicine (ISMRM).

References

External links

20th-century births
Year of birth missing (living people)
Living people
Cornell University faculty
Fellow Members of the IEEE
Fellows of the American Institute for Medical and Biological Engineering